The Amazing Dr. Clitterhouse is a 1938 American crime film directed by Anatole Litvak and starring Edward G. Robinson, Claire Trevor and Humphrey Bogart. It was distributed by Warner Bros. and written by John Wexley and John Huston, based on the 1936 play The Amazing Dr. Clitterhouse, the first play written by short-story writer Barré Lyndon, which ran for three months on Broadway with Cedric Hardwicke after playing in London.

Plot
Dr. Clitterhouse is a wealthy society physician in New York City who decides to research the medical aspects of the behavior of criminals directly by becoming one. He begins a series of daring jewel robberies, measuring his own blood pressure, temperature and pulse before, during and afterwards, but yearns for a larger sample for his study.

From one of his patients, Police Inspector Lewis Lane, he learns the name of the biggest fence in the city, Joe Keller. He goes to meet Keller to sell what he has stolen, only to find out that "Joe" is actually "Jo". The doctor impresses Jo and a gang of thieves headed by 'Rocks' Valentine with his exploits, so Jo invites him to join them, and he accepts.

Dr. Clitterhouse pretends to take a six-week vacation in Europe. As "The Professor", he proceeds to wrest leadership of the gang (and the admiration of Jo) away from Rocks, making him extremely resentful. When they rob a fur warehouse, Rocks locks his rival in a cold-storage vault, but Clitterhouse is freed by Butch, a gang member that Jo had assigned to keep watch on him. Afterwards, Clitterhouse announces he is quitting; he has enough data from studying the gang during their robberies, and his "vacation" time is up. He returns the gang to Rocks's control.

Rocks learns Dr. Clitterhouse's real identity and shows up at his Park Avenue office. Rocks tries to blackmail the doctor into using his office as a safehouse as they rob the doctor's own wealthy friends. Clitterhouse learns that Rocks will not let him publish his incriminating research, and also realizes that he has not studied the ultimate crime – murder – which will be the final chapter to his book. So, he gives a poisoned drink to Rocks, and he studies his symptoms as he dies. Jo helps dispose of the body in the river, but it is recovered and the poison is detected by the police.

The doctor is ultimately caught by his friend, Inspector Lane, and placed on trial. He insists that he did everything for purely scientific reasons and claims that his book is a "sane book" and that it is "impossible for an insane man to write a sane book". His determination to show that he is sane, and therefore willing to face the death penalty, convinces the jury to find him not guilty by reason of insanity.

Cast

Edward G. Robinson as Dr. Clitterhouse
Claire Trevor as Jo Keller
Humphrey Bogart as "Rocks" Valentine
Allen Jenkins as Okay
Donald Crisp as Police Inspector Lewis Lane
Gale Page as Nurse Randolph
Henry O'Neill as Judge
John Litel as Mr. Monroe, the prosecuting attorney
Thurston Hall as Grant

Maxie Rosenbloom as Butch
Burt Hanlon as Pat ("Pal")
Curt Bois as Rabbit
Ward Bond as Tug
Vladimir Sokoloff as Popus ("Poopus")
Billy Wayne as Candy
Robert Homans as Lt. Johnson
Irving Bacon as Foreman of jury

Cast notes
Ronald Reagan's voice can be heard as a radio announcer, a job that Reagan held before he started as a film actor.
Max "Slapsie Maxie" Rosenbloom was a boxer who converted his fame in the ring into a film career playing Runyonesque characters.
Susan Hayward had a part in the film, but her scenes were deleted.

Production

Barré Lyndon's play, The Amazing Dr. Clitterhouse, had been a success in London, and was produced on Broadway – where it opened on March 2, 1937 with Cedric Hardwicke in the lead, and ran for 80 performances, closing in May  – in association with Warner Bros., but the studio had difficulty obtaining the movie rights even so, since Lyndon retained control of them.  Carl Laemmle Jr., Paramount and MGM all bid for the rights, and Laemmle bought them for over $50,000.  He then turned them around and sold them to Warners in return for the loan of Paul Muni for another adaptation of The Hunchback of Notre Dame, a film that was never made. Producer Robert Lord originally wanted Ronald Colman to play the part of Dr. Clitterhouse.

The film was in production from late February to early April 1938 at Warner Bros. studios in Burbank.  Clitterhouse was only Anatole Litvak's second film for Warners.

Response
The Amazing Dr. Clitterhouse premiered in New York on July 20, 1938, and went into general American release on July 30. It was mostly well received. The review in Variety called it "an unquestionable winner" and said that "Robinson...is at his best" and "Bogart's interpretation of the gangster chief...is topflight."

Humphrey Bogart later said that the role of "Rocks" Valentine was one of his least favorite. Robinson and Bogart made five films together: Bullets or Ballots (1936), Kid Galahad (1937) with Bette Davis, The Amazing Dr. Clitterhouse (1938), Brother Orchid (1940) and Key Largo (1948) with Lauren Bacall, Claire Trevor and Lionel Barrymore. Key Largo was a reunion of Robinson, Claire Trevor and Bogart from The Amazing Dr. Clitterhouse.

References

External links
 
 
 
 
1953 radio adaptation of original play at Internet Archive

1938 films
1938 crime films
American black-and-white films
American crime films
American films based on plays
Films directed by Anatole Litvak
Films set in New York City
American gangster films
Warner Bros. films
Films with screenplays by John Huston
1930s English-language films
1930s American films